Michael Mallory (born 1955) is a writer on the subjects of animation and post-war pop culture, and the author of the books X-Men:  The Characters and Their Universe, Universal Studios Monsters:  A Legacy of Horror The Science Fiction Universe and Beyond, and Essential Horror Movies.  As an animation and film historian he has written over 600 articles, frequently for Variety, the Los Angeles Times and Animation Magazine, and has been featured in documentaries and DVD extras about animation.  He co-authored the memoirs of animation legend Iwao Takamoto, which were published in 2009 as Iwao Takamoto:  My Life with a Thousand Characters. He has also written the script for the annual Annie Awards ceremony, the Oscars of the animation industry, since the mid-1990s.

Life
Mallory was born in Port Huron, Michigan, and was raised in Pontiac, Michigan. As a teenager he appeared in summer stock plays with the Kenley Players and went on to receive a degree in Speech, with a theatre/broadcasting emphasis, from Drury College (now Drury University) in Springfield, Missouri.  After a stint as a radio newscaster in Springfield he relocated to Los Angeles to pursue an acting career.  He made numerous appearances on the local stage and played bit roles in films such as Frances, Staying Alive and Eleanor: First Lady of the World (all 1982) and on television in Days of Our Lives, Santa Barbara and General Hospital, as well as a handful of commercials and industrial films.  More recently he has appeared on Mad Men, Vegas, and Mob City, in which he played Abe "Greenie" Greenberg, whose murder propels the plot of the series, Angie Tribeca, and NCIS.  In the late 1980s Mallory made writing his primary pursuit and for a while he served as a writer for Disneyland and other theme park venues.  He scripted the large-format, 3-D attraction film Haunts of the Olde Country, which premiered at Busch Gardens in Williamsburg, Virginia, in 1993 and played there for several years. His 2009 book Universal Studios Monsters:  A Legacy of Horror, a history of Universal horror film series, earned an honorable mention from the Rondo Hatton Classic Horror Awards, and Marvel:  The Expanding Universe Wall Chart took the Silver 2009 Book of the Year Award from ForeWord Reviews. He lives with his wife and son in Glendale, California.

Mystery writing
Mallory also writes murder mysteries, often featuring "Amelia Watson", the second (and previously unheralded) wife of Dr. Watson of Sherlock Holmes fame.  Five volumes of Amelia Watson stories have appeared to date:  the 2000 collection The Adventures of the Second Mrs. Watson, the 2004 novel Murder in the Bath, a second collection, The Exploits of the Second Mrs. Watson, published in 2008, a novel The Stratford Conspiracy, published in 2012, and a third collection, The Other Mrs. Watson, published in 2016 in England.  A second series featuring Hollywood-based detective Dave Beauchamp began in 2013 with the novel Kill the Mother!. The most recent Dave Beauchamp adventure is Dig That Crazy Sphinx!, published in 2022.  Mallory has written more than 150 short stories for adults and children, including a series of mysteries starring an eleven-year-old sleuth named "Scotty," which appeared periodically in the Los Angeles Times.  He was the creator and co-editor (with Lisa Seidman and Rochelle Krich) of the mystery anthology Murder on Sunset Boulevard, which was published through the auspices of the Los Angeles chapter of the national organization, Sisters in Crime, and also co-edited (with Harley Jane Kozak and Nathan Walpow) its follow-up, LAndmarked for Murder. He was among the first recipients of a Derringer Award, winning in 1998 for Best Flash (short-short) Mystery Story, and his story "The Beast of Guangming Peak" was listed as a "Distinguished Mystery Story of 2004" in the book "The Best American Mystery Stories, 2005," edited by Joyce Carol Oates and Otto Penzler. He has been listed in subsequent "Best American Mystery Stories" volumes, in 2014 and 2018. He has been nominated for a Pushcart Prize three times, for both fiction and nonfiction.

Horror writing
Mallory has written horror stories for both young readers and adults.  His novella Night Shocker was published in 1997 by Baronet Books as part of their "FrightTime" series, a string of books along the lines of the then-popular Goosebumps series. He contributed more short horror tales for kids for the "Chiller" page of the website MysteryNet.com.  In 2012, he came out with his first horror novel for adults, The Mural, which is published by Borgo Press.

Journalism
Mallory has written more than 600 magazine, newspaper, and online articles about film, animation, and pop culture, for publications such as The Los Angeles Times, Variety, The Hollywood Reporter, Animation Magazine, Mystery Scene, and scores of others.

Selected bibliography

Novels
 Dig That Crazy Sphinx!
 Ebenezer Scrooge and the Battle for Christmas
 Bada-Bing, Bada-Tomb!
 Death Walks Skid Row
 Dead and In Person!
 Eats to Die For!
 Kill the Mother!
 The Mural
 The Stratford Conspiracy
 Murder in the Bath

Collections
 The Other Mrs. Watson
 The Exploits of the Second Mrs. Watson
 The Adventures of the Second Mrs. Watson

Nonfiction
 Hanna-Barbera Cartoons
 Marvel: The Characters and Their Universe
 X-Men: The Characters and Their Universe
 Marvel: The Expanding Universe Wall Chart
 Universal Studios Monsters: A Legacy of Horror
 Iwao Takamoto: My Life with a Thousand Characters (co-writer)
 The Science Fiction Universe and Beyond
 Essential Horror Movies
 The Art of Krampus
 The Vampire Diaries: Unlocking the Secrets of Mystic Falls
 Marvel's Black Widow

As editor

 LAndmarked for Murder (anthology)
 Murder on Sunset Boulevard (anthology)

Short stories
"The Sacred White Elephant of Mandalay" (2010, published in Sherlock Holmes: The American Years)

See also

The Jetsons

References

Living people
Novelists from Michigan
American non-fiction writers
American mystery writers
Historians of animation
People from Port Huron, Michigan
1955 births
Writers from Glendale, California
Drury University alumni
American male novelists
American male non-fiction writers